Armi elää! is a 2015 Finnish drama film directed by Jörn Donner. The film is based on the life of Finnish entrepreneur Armi Ratia through years 1949–1968 when she founded the textile and clothing company Marimekko and led it to international success. Written in a form of metafiction, the film follows a theatre group preparing a play of Ratia.

In March 2016 the film received two Jussi Awards, for screenplay by Karoliina Lindgren and scenic design by Otso Linnalaakso.

Main cast

Minna Haapkylä as Armi Ratia / Maria
Hannu-Pekka Björkman as Viljo Ratia
Laura Birn as Leena
Rea Mauranen as Kerttu

References

2015 drama films
Films directed by Jörn Donner
Films set in Finland
Films shot in Finland
Metafictional works
2015 films
Finnish drama films
2010s Finnish-language films